Şalpazarı is a town and district of Trabzon Province in the Black Sea region of Turkey. The population is around 12,000 including the surrounding villages. The mayor is Refik Kurukız (MHP). Şalpazarı is a home to sizeable Chepni Turkmen population.

Şalpazarı has a creek called Ağasar.

History 
During the Ottoman period, Şalpazarı was a village that was a part of the town of Görele. In 1809 Şalpazarı became a part of Vakfıkebir. Then in 1987 it gained town status.

References

External links
District governor's official website 

Populated places in Trabzon Province
Districts of Trabzon Province